Fort Johnson may refer to:

Places
 Fort Johnson, New York, a village in Montgomery County

Structures
 Fort Johnson, a historic site in Hancock County, Illinois
 Fort Johnson (South Carolina), a historic site on the northeast point of James Island, South Carolina
 Old Fort Johnson, a historic house in the village of Fort Johnson, New York